is a Japanese comedy manga series written and illustrated by Aya Nakahara. It was serialized in Shueisha's shōjo manga magazine Bessatsu Margaret from May 2009 to March 2010, with its chapters collected into three tankōbon volumes.

Characters

Publication
Written and illustrated by Aya Nakahara, Berry Dynamite was serialized in Shueisha's Bessatsu Margaret magazine from May 13, 2009, to March 13, 2010. Three tankōbon volumes have been released from October 2009 to May 2010.

The series was published in French by Delcourt.

Volume list

Reception
On manga-news.com, the series has a staff grade of 16 out of 20. On Manga Sanctuary, the series has a staff grade of 5.5 out of 10 from two staff members. On planetebd.com, Faustine Lillaz  gave all three volumes a grade of "good, nice". On bdzoom.com, Gwenaël Jacquet said the "heroines are dynamic" and "the story is catching". On Anime News Network, Rebecca Silverman called it "a delight of a series, laugh-out-loud funny in places".

References

External links
Berry Dynamite at delcourt.akata.fr 

Comedy anime and manga
Music in anime and manga
Shōjo manga
Shueisha manga